Ladinia is neologism used to describe an Alpine region in the Dolomites mountain range of Northern Italy, divided between the Italian provinces of Belluno, South Tyrol, and Trento. The area takes its name from its inhabitants, the Ladin people, a Romance-speaking ethnic group. Their Ladin language is generally considered a Rhaeto-Romance language, though there is a scientific debate (Questione Ladina) if it forms part of a wider Northern Italian dialect continuum.

History

As a Rhaeto-Romance language, Ladin was part of a large area, which about 1000 AD stretched from Ticino (Tessin) and Grisons in the Swiss Alps to the Julian Alps (in present-day Slovenia) in the east.

The Ladin people developed a national identity during the 19th century, when most of the area—except for the Venetian parts—was incorporated into the Princely County of Tyrol and, as part of the Austrian Empire, underwent a process of Germanisation. The local peasants were called Welsche by Germans (similar to Wenden or Windische for Slavs), while they called themselves "Latin" (Ladin). The Ladin movement was sparked by the Tyrolean Rebellion during the Napoleonic Wars; in 1833, the Ladin language was codified by Micurà de Rü (alias Nikolaus Bacher, 1789–1847), a priest from Badia. A Naziun Ladina association was established in 1870 by several seminarists in Brixen, among them Saint Joseph Freinademetz; followed by the Uniun Ladina, founded in 1905 at Innsbruck, which also maintained relations with Romansh and Friulian organisations.

Ceded of Italy after World War I, the Ladin community, in spite of its high level of identification with the land, did not enjoy any official recognition. On 5 May 1920, representatives from the Ladin valleys met at Gardena Pass to protest against the resolutions of the Treaty of Saint-Germain-en-Laye and to demand their rights of self-determination according to the Fourteen Points outlined by US President Woodrow Wilson. A blue-white-green flag was adopted, symbolising Ladinia's forests, the snow-covered peaks, and the blue sky above. The Ladin movement was suppressed under the Italian Fascist regime, when many Ladin citizens joined the German emigrants under the terms of the 1939 South Tyrol Option Agreement.

After World War II, an Uniun Generela was re-established and the Ladin flag was again occasionally displayed. In 1976, the Istitut Ladin Micurà de Rü was founded at San Martin de Tor for the promotion of the Ladin culture. The Museum Ladin opened in 2001 at nearby Tor Castle.

Territory

The territory occupies approximately 1,200 square kilometers (460 sq. mi), encompassing five valleys in the Dolomite Alps centred around the Sella massif: 
Fascia Valley (Val de Fascia) in Trentino
Val Gardena (Gherdëina) and Val Badia in South Tyrol
Livinallongo (Fodom) and Ampezzo (Anpezo) in Veneto. 
Other notable peaks in the region include Marmolada at 3,343 m (10,968 ft) and Antelao, the "King of the Dolomites" at 3,263 m (10,705 ft). The main rivers are the Aviso stream, a tributary of the Adige rising from the Marmolada Glacier and running through the Fascia Valley, the Boite in Ampezzo, a tributary of the Piave. Other creeks include the Gran Ega in Val Badia and the Derjon in Val Gardena.

Administratively, Ladinia is divided between two Italian regions, three provinces, and 18 small municipalities:
{| class="wikitable sortable" style="text-align:left"
|- style="background-color:#efefef;"
! align="center" | LadinName || align="center" | ItalianName || align="center" | GermanName || align="center" | Province || align="center" | Area(km2) || align="center" | Population
|-
| Anpezo
| Cortina d’Ampezzo
| Hayden
| Belluno
| align=right|255
| align=right|6,150
|-
| Urtijëi
| Ortisei
| St. Ulrich in Gröden
| South Tyrol
| align=right|24
| align=right|4,569
|-
| Badia
| Badia
| Abtei
| South Tyrol
| align=right|82
| align=right|3,237
|-
| Mareo
| Marebbe
| Enneberg
| South Tyrol
| align=right|161
| align=right|2,684
|-
| Moéna
| Moena
| Moena
| Trentino
| align=right|82
| align=right|2,628
|-
| Sëlva
| Selva di Val Gardena
| Wolkenstein in Gröden
| South Tyrol
| align=right|53
| align=right|2,589
|-
| Poza
| Pozza di Fassa
| Potzach im Fassatal
| Trentino
| align=right|73
| align=right|1,983
|-
| Cianacei
| Canazei
| Kanzenei
| Trentino
| align=right|67
| align=right|1,844
|-
| Santa Cristina Gherdëina
| Santa Cristina Valgardena
| St. Christina in Gröden
| South Tyrol
| align=right|31
| align=right|1,840
|-
| San Martin de Tor
| San Martino in Badia
| St. Martin in Thurn
| South Tyrol
| align=right|76
| align=right|1,727
|-
| Fodom
| Livinallongo del Col di Lana
| Buchenstein
| Belluno
| align=right|99
| align=right|1,436
|-
| Corvara
| Corvara
| Kurfar
| South Tyrol
| align=right|42
| align=right|1,266
|-
| La Val
| La Valle
| Wengen
| South Tyrol
| align=right|39
| align=right|1,251
|-
| Vich
| Vigo di Fassa
| Vig im Fassatal
| Trentino
| align=right|26
| align=right|1,142
|-
| Ciampedèl
| Campitello di Fassa
| Kampidel im Fassatal
| Trentino
| align=right|25
| align=right|732
|-
| Sorèga
| Soraga
| Überwasser
| Trentino
| align=right|19
| align=right|677
|-
| Mazin
| Mazzin
| Mazzin
| Trentino
| align=right|23
| align=right|440
|-
| Col
| Colle Santa Lucia
| Verseil
| Belluno
| align=right|15
| align=right|418
|}

Furthermore, the Ladin language is officially recognised in 53 comuni of Belluno, South Tyrol, and Trentino.

See also
 Friuli

References

External links
 Information about the Ladinia and the Ladin culture

 
Dolomites
South Tyrol
Trentino-Alto Adige/Südtirol
Ladin language
Ladin people